MTV Campus Diaries is a college connect digital platform.

MTV Campus Diaries has been associated with vaguely known brands like B'Llue  Amazon.com and Dell

Hosts/ VJs 
VJ Jose Covaco
Gurbani Judge
 Gaelyn Mendonca
 Parth Samthaan
 Krissann Barretto
 Varun Sood
 Nikhil Chinapa
 Benafsha Soonawalla

References

MTV (Indian TV channel) original programming
2014 Indian television series debuts
Indian reality television series